The 2024 Utah gubernatorial election will be held on November 5, 2024, to elect the governor of Utah, concurrently with the 2024 U.S. presidential election, as well as elections to the United States Senate and elections to the United States House of Representatives and various state and local elections. Incumbent Republican Governor Spencer Cox is running for re-election to a second term in office.

Background 
A conservative western state, Utah is considered safely Republican at the federal level, with both of its U.S. senators and all of its U.S. representatives belonging to the Republican Party. In the 2020 presidential election, Donald Trump carried Utah by 20 percentage points.

Cox was first elected in 2020, defeating Christopher Peterson by 33 points.

Most analysts consider Cox to be a heavy favorite to win reelection, given the state's partisan lean and his margin from the last election.

Republican primary

Candidates

Declared
Spencer Cox, incumbent governor
Running mate: Deidre Henderson, incumbent lieutenant governor

Publicly expressed interest
 Jason Chaffetz, former U.S. Representative from Utah's 3rd congressional district (2009–2017)

Potential
 Robert O'Brien, former U.S. National Security Advisor (2019–2021)

General election

Predictions

References

External links
Official campaign websites 
Spencer Cox (R) for Governor

2024
Governor
Utah